Pál Sándor (born 19 October 1939) is a Hungarian film director, producer, and screenwriter. He has directed 28 films since 1964. His 1976 film A Strange Role was entered into the 27th Berlin International Film Festival, where it won the Silver Bear.

Selected filmography
 Football of the Good Old Days (1973)
 A Strange Role (1976)
 Miss Arizona (1987)
 Daughter of Darkness (1990)

References

External links

1939 births
Living people
Hungarian film directors
Hungarian film producers
Hungarian screenwriters
Male screenwriters
Hungarian male writers